Dr Milson Russen Rhodes (1871- ) was a general practitioner in Chorlton-on-Medlock.  He lived in Didsbury.

He was very active in the State Medical Service Association and the British Medical Association.  He studied medicine at Owen's College and qualified in 1902.

In 1912 he proposed an outline of a new system of a National Medical Service which was published in the British Medical Journal.  He advocated a list system much like the system adopted by Lloyd George's government.

References

British general practitioners
1871 births
Year of death missing
Alumni of the Victoria University of Manchester